Casmaria perryi is a species of predatory sea snails, marine gastropod molluscs in the subfamily Cassinae, the helmet snails and bonnet snails.

Description
The size of an adult shell varies between 30 mm and 53 mm.

Distribution 
This marine species occurs off New Zealand, southeastern Australia and Easter Island.

References

 Iredale, T. 1912. New generic names and new species of marine Mollusca. Proceedings of the Malacological Society of London 10: 217-228, pl. 9, 3 text figs
 Iredale, T. & McMichael, D.F. 1962. A reference list of the marine Mollusca of New South Wales. Memoirs of the Australian Museum 11: 1-109 
 Abbott, R.T. 1968. The helmet shells of the world (Cassidae). Part 1. Indo-Pacific Mollusca 2(9): 7-201
 Rehder, H.A. 1980. The marine mollusks of Easter Island (Isla de Pascura) and Sala y Gómez. Smithsonian Contributions to Zoology 289: 1-167
 Wilson, B. 1993. Australian Marine Shells. Prosobranch Gastropods. Kallaroo, Western Australia : Odyssey Publishing Vol. 1 408 pp.
 Kreipl, Kurt. 1997. Recent Cassidae. Verlag Christa Hemmen: Wiesbaden.
 Beu, A.G., Bouchet, P. & Tröndlé, J. 2012. Tonnoidean gastropods of French Polynesia. Molluscan Research 32(2): 61-120

External links

 Gastropods.com : Casmaria perryi (accessed 27 December 2016)

Cassidae
Gastropods described in 1912
Molluscs of New Zealand